Emmett Wilson (September 17, 1882 – May 29, 1918) was a United States representative from Florida. He was the grandson of Augustus Emmett Maxwell. Wilson was born during the temporary residence of his parents at Belize City, British Honduras.

Wilson moved with his parents to Chipley, Florida, where he attended the public schools and Florida State College at Tallahassee, Florida. He was employed as a railroad telegrapher and later as a stenographer and was graduated from the law department of the Stetson University at DeLand in 1904. Admitted to the bar the same year, he commenced practice in Marianna, Florida. He later moved to Pensacola, Florida, in 1906 and continued the practice of law.

Wilson was appointed assistant United States attorney for the northern district of Florida February 1, 1907, and United States attorney for the same district October 7, 1907. He held the position until March 1909. He was the state’s attorney for the first judicial circuit of Florida 1911-1913 and was elected as a Democrat to the Sixty-third and Sixty-fourth Congresses (March 4, 1913 – March 3, 1917). He was an unsuccessful candidate for renomination in 1916. After leaving Congress, he resumed the practice of law in Pensacola, Florida and died there in 1918. He was buried in St. John’s Cemetery.

References

1882 births
1918 deaths
Florida State University alumni
Democratic Party members of the United States House of Representatives from Florida
People from Pensacola, Florida
20th-century American politicians
19th-century American politicians
Stetson University College of Law alumni
People from Belize City
Belizean emigrants to the United States
People from Chipley, Florida
United States Attorneys for the Northern District of Florida